Cokley is a surname. Notable people with the surname include:

Chris Cokley (born 1996), American basketball player
Rebecca Cokley (born 1978), American disability rights activist and public speaker

See also
Coakley
Cowley (surname)

English-language surnames